Dame Karen Olive Poutasi  (née Davidson; born 12 July 1949) is a New Zealand government official.

Early life, education and family
Poutasi was born in Ranfurly on 12 July 1949, and is the daughter of Gladys Enid Davidson (née Edmonds) and John Davidson. She was educated at Gore High School between 1963 and 1967, completed medical training at the University of Otago, and studied management at Otago and at Harvard University.

In 1972, she married Samelu Faapoi Poutasi, and the couple went on to have four children.

Career
She was medical superintendent of Middlemore Hospital, Auckland, until 1987, when she was appointed chief health officer at the Ministry of Health.

She has served as Director General of Health at the Ministry of Health (1995 to 2006), and as chief executive officer of the New Zealand Qualifications Authority (2006 to 2020). In 2019 she was seconded from the New Zealand Qualifications Authority to serve as Commissioner for the Waikato District Health Board.

Honours and awards
Poutasi received the New Zealand Suffrage Centennial Medal in 1993.

In the 2006 Queen's Birthday Honours, Poutasi was appointed a Companion of the New Zealand Order of Merit, for services to health administration, including as Director General of Health. In the 2020 Queen's Birthday Honours, she was promoted to Dame Companion of the New Zealand Order of Merit, for services to education and the state.

References

Living people
1949 births
Dames Companion of the New Zealand Order of Merit
University of Otago alumni
Harvard University alumni
New Zealand public health doctors
Women public health doctors
New Zealand public servants
People educated at Gore High School
Recipients of the New Zealand Suffrage Centennial Medal 1993
People from Ranfurly, New Zealand